Lottia subrugosa is a species of sea snail, a true limpet, a marine gastropod mollusk in the family Lottiidae. It is still designated under its synonyms Acmaea subrugosa or Collisella subrugosa in many textbooks.

Distribution and habitat
This species is found along the coasts of Brazil and Uruguay, mostly in the mid-intertidal zone. It is the most common limpet with large population sizes in the Brazilian midlittoral. It can fill the small gaps in mussel beds dominated by  Brachidontes solisianus and Brachidontes darwinianus. They are also very abundant in the regions dominated by the barnacle Tetraclita stalactifera.

Description
The shell size is between 16 and 30 mm

References

 d'Orbigny, A. 1841. Mollusques. Voyage dans l'Amérique Méridionale 5: 425–488, pls. 72–76, 79–80. P. Bertrand: Paris. [True date: -- --- 1841.]
 

Lottiidae
Gastropods described in 1841